Senn High School is a public four-year high school located in the Edgewater neighborhood on the North Side of Chicago, Illinois, United States. Senn is operated by the Chicago Public Schools system and was opened on 3 February 1913. The school is named in honor of surgeon, instructor, and founder of the Association of Military Surgeons of the United States Nicholas Senn. Senn has advanced placement classes, an International Baccalaureate Diploma Program, a fine arts program (theater, visual arts, dance, and music), and a Junior Reserve Officers' Training Corps program. It formerly housed the public but administratively separate, Hyman Rickover Naval Academy. The architect for the Senn High School building and campus was Arthur F. Hussander, who was the chief architect for the Chicago Board of Education; the contractor was Frank Paschen.

Curriculum 
Senn was granted the International Baccalaureate program in 1999. Senn also has the TESOL/Multilingual Program, an English as a Second Language program for limited English proficiency students, the Striving for Excellence Program (for a select group of freshmen identified as struggling or at-risk), and the Education-To-Careers Program (for 10th, 11th and 12th graders that includes job shadowing, apprenticeships, and partnerships with local businesses). In 2011, it was announced that Senn would be adding a fine and performing arts magnet program.

Service learning/extra-curricular activities
The school encourages its students to participate in community service. Information regarding service learning is provided by the Service Learning Coach. Student organizations at Senn range from the Global Heritage Club to the Red Cross Club.

Hyman G. Rickover Naval Academy
With support from Mayor Richard M. Daley, Senator Dick Durbin, Alderman Mary Ann Smith, and Chicago Public Schools, a wing of the school was converted into the Rickover Naval Academy, named for Admiral Hyman G. Rickover. On 6 September 2005, the academy opened its doors with approximately 120 cadets and 12 staff members. The academy is a college preparatory school. Rickover Naval Academy moved into their own campus in the Portage Park neighborhood starting with the 2019–2020 school year.

Notable alumni
 Cliff Aberson – professional football player with NFL Green Bay Packers (1946) and a Major League Baseball outfielder (1947–49) with the Chicago Cubs
 Buddy Bregman – musical arranger, record producer and composer
Corey Holcomb – stand-up comedian, actor, and 5150 Show webcast creator and host
 Donald Briggs – actor
 Carlos Eire – historian, writer, professor at Yale University, author of Waiting for Snow in Havana
 Joseph Epstein – writer, essayist, and editor
 Jimmy Evert – tennis coach whose students included Jennifer Capriati and his daughter, Chris Evert
 William Friedkin – Academy Award–winning film director
 Shecky Greene – comedian
 Alan Hargesheimer – professional baseball player for San Francisco Giants, Chicago Cubs, and Kansas City Royals
 Barbara Harris – actress on stage, television, and screen
 Herblock (Herbert Lawrence Block) – political cartoonist, three-time Pulitzer Prize winner, and Presidential Medal of Freedom honoree
 Gene Honda – media spokesman and public address announcer for Chicago White Sox and Chicago Blackhawks
 John Jakes – bestselling author
 Allan Katz – comedy writer, television producer (M*A*S*H)
 Harvey Korman – Emmy Award-winning comedic actor
 Dixie Lee – actress/singer on stage and screen
 Lou Levy – jazz bebop artist 
 William Keepers Maxwell, Jr. – novelist and editor
 Clayton Moore – actor best known for his portrayal of The Lone Ranger
 Lois Nettleton – actress in film and on television for nearly six decades
 Mike North – host of television and radio sports shows
 Cliff Norton – character actor and radio announcer
 Anita O'Day – jazz singer
 Malcolm Ross O'Neill – class of 1958, U.S. Army lieutenant general, PhD physicist and government official
 Irna Phillips – creator of radio and TV soap operas
 Fritz Pollard, Jr. – bronze medalist in the 110 meter hurdles at the 1936 Olympics
 Harold Ramis – comedy writer, film director, and actor
 Annette Rogers – gold medalist in 4 x 100 metres relay at 1932 Olympics and 1936 Olympics
 William Russo – jazz arranger and composer
 Sidney Sheldon – Academy Award and Tony Award-winning playwright, screenwriter, and novelist
 Scott Simon – Emmy and Peabody Award-winning writer and radio personality
 Lee Stern – trader at the Chicago Board of Trade, minority owner of Chicago White Sox and president of Chicago's former NASL soccer team, the Sting
 Stanley Tigerman – architect and designer
 Burr Tillstrom – Emmy and Peabody Award-winning puppeteer
 Sarajane Wells - Peabody Award-winning actress and educator
 Byron Wien - class of 1950, BA & MBA Harvard, 21 years Chief (later Senior) U.S. Investment Strategist at Morgan Stanley

References

External links

Official website
Opposition website
Senn High School's Big Transformation

1913 establishments in Illinois
Educational institutions established in 1913
Public high schools in Chicago